Phytoecia cephalotes is a species of beetle in the family Cerambycidae. It was described by Küster in 1846. It is known from Italy, Greece, Croatia, Bosnia and Herzegovina, and Slovenia. It feeds on Trinia dalechampii.

References

Phytoecia
Beetles described in 1846